Vladimir Plyakin (born 19 September 1981, Kuybyshev) is a Russian political figure and a deputy of the 8th State Duma.
 
After graduating from the Samara Municipal Institute of Management, Plyakin held various in senior positions in a number of Moscow companies, including Development Group and Continental Group. From 2017 to 2021, he was the Deputy Head of the Department for interaction with federal government authorities. Since September 2021, he has served as deputy of the 8th State Duma.

References
 

 

1981 births
Living people
New People politicians
21st-century Russian politicians
Eighth convocation members of the State Duma (Russian Federation)
Politicians from Samara, Russia